Carmen, Baby is a 1967 American-German-Yugoslav romantic drama film directed by Radley Metzger, based on the novella Carmen by Prosper Mérimée (which also inspired Bizet popular opera, Carmen).

Plot
A liberated woman tempts a local police officer into a romantic entanglement with unpleasant consequences.

Cast 

 Uta Levka as Carmen
 Claus Ringer as Jose
 Carl Möhner as Medicio
 Barbara Valentin as Dolores
 Walter Wilz  as Baby Lucas
 Christiane Rücker  as Misty
 Arthur Brauss as Garcia
 Doris Arden as Darcy
 Michael Münzer as Magistrate

Reception
The film Carmen, Baby, according to one reviewer, was the beginning of Metzger's successful style in his later films: that is, adapting "a literary classic in a gorgeous European locale with high polish and a goodly helping of sophisticated sex and seduction." Film critic Jesse Vogel noted that the film is an example of Metzger's signature style, "cool, classy, distant, with a distinctively European sensibility". According to film reviewer Gary Morris, Carmen was "well played" by Uta Levka; lighting and camerawork by Hans Jura was "first-rate".
Another reviewer wrote that the film had "a rather classy look" and that the performers were "attractive" and the setting  "beautiful".

Legal issues
In the case of Rabe v. Washington, 405 U.S. 313 (1972), the Supreme Court of the United States decided that the manager of a drive-in movie theater could not be charged with obscenity for showing the film which was not wholly determined to be obscene, but only parts were, holding that the citizens of Washington State had no notice under the Sixth Amendment that the place where a film was shown was an element of the offense.

Popular culture
Wally Lamb mentioned the bottle dance scene from Carmen, Baby in his 2016 book I'll Take You There.

Notes
According to one film reviewer, Radley Metzger's films, including those made during the Golden Age of Porn (1969–1984), are noted for their "lavish design, witty screenplays, and a penchant for the unusual camera angle". Another reviewer noted that his films were "highly artistic — and often cerebral ... and often featured gorgeous cinematography". Film and audio works by Metzger have been added to the permanent collection of the Museum of Modern Art (MoMA) in New York City.

References

External links
 
 Carmen, Baby at MUBI

American erotic drama films
Erotic romance films
Films based on Carmen
Films directed by Radley Metzger
German erotic drama films
1967 films
1960s erotic drama films
West German films
Works subject to a lawsuit
Yugoslav drama films
1960s English-language films
English-language German films
English-language Yugoslav films
1960s American films
1960s German films